Pachyrhabda bacterias is a moth of the family Stathmopodidae first described by Edward Meyrick in 1913. It is found in Sri Lanka and Australia.

References

Stathmopodidae
Moths described in 1913
Moths of Asia
Moths of Australia
Taxa named by Edward Meyrick